The Busega Martyrs Memorial is the site where the first three Ugandan Martyrs were killed in 1885.

The Uganda Martyrs were new Christian converts in Buganda kingdom who defied their new king Kabaka Mwanga and refused to denounce their newfound religion. As a result, the King ordered their killing and most of them were killed on another Martyrs' site called Namugongo.

Busega Martyrs memorial site is also known as Busega Mpimaerebera, Mpiima is a Luganda word for a cane made from hippopotamus skin.

The first Uganda Martyrs killed at this site were, Mark Kakumba who was aged 16, Noah Serwanga aged 19 and Yusuf Rugarama aged 12.

History 
The killing of the first Martyrs came about as a result of Alexander Murdoch Mackay'sMissionary activities which were detested by Kabaka Mwanga. The king later asked Mackay to leave Buganda and as he was leaving, he tried to escape with the three of his native helpers. They were intercepted by the king's soldiers led by Kapalaga Mujaasi and accused of treason and later executed at Busega where the memorial stands today.

Years later, Bishop Wilkinson of Northern and central Europe heard the story of these Uganda Martyrs and was touched thus sending a memorial cross to be erected at the location where the first 3 Uganda Martyrs were killed. On july 14th 1910, a commemoration service led by Rev. Alfred Tucker, Bishop of Uganda at the time was held to unveil the martyrs memorial cross.

A church was later built at the site and on 28th/1/1984, the Archbishop of Canterbury,  the most Rev. Robert Runcie laid the foundation stone and officially opened the church at the Martyrs church.

Location 
The site is located in Natetete Archdeaconry Namirebe Diocese at Busega town in Kampala Uganda.

References 

Buganda
Christian martyrs